Johann Sebastian Bach composed the church cantata  (Behold, I will send out many fishers), 88 in Leipzig for the fifth Sunday after Trinity within the liturgical year and first performed it on 21 July 1726.

Bach composed the cantata after several complete cantata cycles written in Leipzig for the occasions of the liturgical year. The cantata text resembles works which his second cousin Johann Ludwig Bach set to music. Based on the prescribed gospel reading of the great catch of fish, an unknown librettist based his poetry on quotations from the Old Testament in the opening movement and the New Testament as the central movement, and closed it by the final stanza of Georg Neumark's hymn "". The cantata is structured in seven movements in two parts (three and four movements), to be performed before and after the sermon. It is scored for an intimate ensemble of four vocal soloists, a choir only in the chorale, two horns, two oboes d'amore, taille, strings and continuo. The central movement is composed as a biblical scene, with the Evangelist introducing Jesus sending Peter, a fisherman, to "fish" men.

History and words 

Bach composed the cantata in Leipzig for the Fifth Sunday after Trinity. The prescribed readings for the Sunday were from the First Epistle of Peter,  "Sanctify the Lord God in your hearts", and from the Gospel of Luke, Peter's great catch of fish. The text of this cantata and six others is similar in structure and content to cantatas texts set by Johann Ludwig Bach, his second cousin. The theme is derived from the gospel. A related verse of Jeremiah opens the cantata. The prophecy referred originally to the return from the captivity in Babylon. The central movement, opening the second part to be performed after the sermon, is the quotation of verse 10 from the gospel. The cantata is closed by the final stanza of Georg Neumark's hymn "" (1641). This chorale had served as the base for Bach's chorale cantata for the same occasion in 1724, part of his second annual cycle.

Bach led the first performance of the cantata on 21 July 1726.

Music

Scoring and structure 

The cantata is structured in two parts to be performed before and after the sermon, the first part in three solo movements, the second in three solo movements and a closing chorale. It is scored for four vocal soloists (soprano (S), alto (A), tenor (T) and bass (B)), a four-part choir SATB only in the chorale, two horns (Co), two oboes d'amore (Oa), taille (Ot), two violins (Vl), viola (Va), and basso continuo (Bc). The duration is given as 22 minutes. The autograph title page reads: "Domin. 5 post Trinit. / Siehe, ich will viel Fischer aussenden, / a / 4 Voci / 2 Corni / 3 Hautb. d'Amour / 2 Viol. / Viola / e / Cont. / di / J.S.Bach."

In the following table of the movements, the scoring follows the Neue Bach-Ausgabe. The keys and time signatures are taken from Alfred Dürr, using the symbols for common time (4/4) and alla breve (2/2). The instruments are shown separately for winds and strings, while the continuo, playing throughout, is not shown.

Movements

1 
The opening movement, "" (Behold, I will send out many fishers), is given to the bass solo, possibly because Jeremiah has God speak in the first person. The music follows the text in two sections, as in a motet. Probably therefore Bach avoided the title aria and wrote  instead. Some cantatas on texts by Christiana Mariana von Ziegler from the second annual cycle begin in a similar way with a bible quotation, of Jesus saying "" (I am a Good Shepherd, BWV 85), "" (It is good for you that I leave, BWV 108), and Jesus saying "" (Until now you have asked for nothing in My name, BWV 87).

The first section paints a seascape in undulating figuration of the strings with the oboes in 6/8 time on a pedal point. Bach "represents the movement of waves and water", which is termed barcarolle by John Eliot Gardiner, the conductor of the Bach Cantata Pilgrimage in 2000. The voice presents the text several times in varied declamation. Suddenly the scene changes to a hunting scene, horns join the orchestra, the tempo in common time is marked "". The voice is again set in expressive declamation, saying "And afterwards I will send out many hunters ...".

2 
The recitative "" (How easily could the Highest do without us), ends on a question, "Does He ... abandon us to the deceit and trickery of the enemy?"

3 
The answer is given in the aria "" (No, God is always concerned), It begins immediately, without the usual ritornello, a passionate: "" (No, no). The middle section begins with a contrasting, but also passionate "" (Yes, yes). In the very end, the strings join the obbligato oboe d'amore and play a ritornello, reminiscent of a minuet. According to Alfred Dürr, the clear, even structure may symbolize the "" ("right path" or "true path") mentioned in the text.

4 
Movement 4 is a scene from the gospel, and forms the centre of the composition. The tenor as the Evangelist announces "" (Jesus said to Simon). The direct speech of Jesus, calling Peter as his disciple, is sung by the bass as the vox Christi (voice of Christ): "" (Fear not, from henceforth thou shalt catch men). The careful phasing is set on a continuo quasi ostinato.

5 
A duet of soprano and alto, "" (If God Himself calls, then blessing) reflects God's blessing

6 
A recitative of the soprano, "" (What then can frighten you in your journey) expresses the comsequence.

7 
The closing chorale confirms, "" (Sing, pray and walk in God's ways). It is a four-part setting.

Recordings 

The listing is taken from the selection provided on the Bach Cantatas Website. Ensembles playing period instruments in historically informed performance are marked by green background.

References

Sources 
 
 Siehe, ich will viel Fischer aussenden BWV 88; BC A 105 / Sacred cantata (5th Sunday after Trinity) Bach Digital
 BWV 88 Siehe, ich will viel Fischer aussenden English translation, University of Vermont
 Luke Dahn: BWV 88.7 bach-chorales.com

Church cantatas by Johann Sebastian Bach
1726 compositions